Edelweiss (German: Edelweiß) is a European mountain flower.

Edelweiss may also refer to:

People
 Edelweiss (actress) (born 1977), Russian-Bulgarian pornographic actress
 Edelweiss (disambiguation)

Plants 
 Edelweiss (grape), a table and white wine grape
 Chasselas or Edelweiss, a wine grape 
 Javanese edelweiss or Anaphalis javanica, a plant species found on the mountains of Indonesia
 Leontopodium
 Rauschling Edelweiss or Completer, a wine grape

Arts, entertainment, and media

Gaming
 Edelweiss, an expansion module for the Panzer Grenadier series board games
 Edelweiss, a tank prototype in the videogame Valkyria Chronicles

Literature
 Edelweiss (visual novel), a 2008 Japanese visual novel developed by Overdrive
 Edelweiss, an online book publishers' catalogue by Above the Treeline
 Edelweiss, capital of the fictional European nation of Graustark

Magazines
 Edelweiss (magazine), a magazine published by Ringier in Switzerland

Music
 Edelweiss (band), an Austrian band in the late 1980s and early 1990s
 Edelweiß (album), a 1982 album by Joachim Witt
 Edelweiss (Drezden album), 2009
 "Edelweiss" (song), a 1959 show tune from the Rodgers and Hammerstein's The Sound of Music
 Edelweiss, a piano solo, Op. 31 by Gustav Lange
"Es war ein Edelweiss", a 1941 marching song (popular during World War II) by Herms Niel

Television
 "Edelweiss" (Space Ghost Coast to Coast), a television episode

Brands and enterprises 
 Edelweiss, a beer produced by the Schoenhofen Brewing Company
 Edelweiss Air, a Swiss charter airline
 Edelweiss Lodge and Resort, an AFRC hotel complex in Germany run by the United States military
 Edelweiss Vacation Village and Campground
 Edelweiss Pianos or Edelweiss, a British piano company
 Edelweiss Valley or Edelweiss, a ski resort in Quebec

Nazi-related 
 Edelweiss (anti-partisan unit), a German anti-partisan unit organized on the Slovak territory during World War II
 Edelweiss Pirates, an anti-Nazi youth culture in Germany before, during, and after World War II
 Kampfgeschwader 51 "Edelweiss", a World War II German Luftwaffe bomber group
 Operation Edelweiss, a German plan to capture the Caucasus and the oil fields of Baku in World War II

Transport vehicles
 Edelweiss (train), an international express train in Europe
 Duruble Edelweiss or Edelweiss, a French light utility monoplane designed by Roland Duruble
 Siren Edelweiss, a French glider produced by SIREN as the C30S Edelweiss

Other uses
 Edelweiss (skyscraper), a building in Moscow
 Edelweiss (political party), a regional political party of Aosta Valley (Italy)
 EDELWEISS, a European experiment searching for dark matter
 10th Separate Mountain Assault Brigade "Edelweiss", a unit of the Ukrainian Ground Forces
  (previously "Edelweiss"), a special unit of the National Guard of Russia

See also
 Eidelweiss, New Hampshire, village district